Rocks'n'Diamonds is a puzzle video game with elements of Boulder Dash, Supaplex, Emerald Mine, Solomon's Key, and Sokoban clone. It is free software under the GNU GPL-2.0-only license created by Artsoft Entertainment and designed by Holger Schemel.

Gameplay 

Rocks'n'Diamonds features gameplay elements from all the games mentioned above, usually in the form of sub-games, although levels can feature combinations of elements from any of the games mentioned above, as well as new ones.

There are currently more than 50,000 levels available on Rocks'n'Diamonds-related pages. Rocks'n'Diamonds can also read native levels from the games Emerald Mine, Supaplex and Diamond Caves II.

Boulder Dash 

The Boulder Dash game involves collecting a set number of diamonds after which an exit door opens through which the player can enter the next level. The levels are filled with dirt which can be dug simply by moving through it. This creates empty space. Diamonds can be collected by moving into them. Rocks and diamonds can rest on dirt, walls (only indestructible and slippery/magic walls), or other rocks and gems, but once these are removed (or the space next to them), they will fall down. This is sometimes useful, as the player can drop things on top of monsters (butterflies and fireflies) roaming the levels. Some destroyed monsters drop gems necessary to achieve the necessary number to complete the level. Amoeba can be dangerous and unpredictable, but also occasionally useful for several reasons of too few diamonds, or if you need to destroy a monster.

Supaplex and Emerald Mine 

The Supaplex and Emerald Mine games can be considered clones of Boulder Dash themselves, although they have added elements, including explosives, acid, locked doors with matched keys, and more.
Rocks'n'Diamonds provides a download of approximately 50000 Emerald Mine levels, however, it can only play a very limited amount of them under its primary engine; because of this, it utilizes an older version of Emerald Mine for X11 to play those levels.

Sokoban 

The Sokoban game is a puzzle, and can be considered to be viewed from above, as its elements are not affected by gravity. This game lets the player push giant light bulbs into sockets in order to finish the level.

Level editor 
The game includes a level editor that lets the player create custom levels. The game also supports custom graphics, as well as whole new level elements which can be created without any programming knowledge.

Development 
With its release in 1995, it is one of the earliest games available for Linux, and it also runs on MS-DOS, Microsoft Windows, Unix, and Mac OS X. The MS-DOS version is based on code by Guido Schulz.  The native Emerald Mine game engine is based on an older version of Emerald Mine for X11 by David Tritscher, which is used to read and play all native Emerald Mine levels.

Since 2014 the source code is available via a Git repository.
The game was later ported to various platforms, for instance in 2014 to the OpenPandora handheld.

Reviews
The game has been praised and noted by Free Software Magazine and Linux Magazine.

See also 

 List of open-source video games

References

External links 
 
 Forum Official forum
 
 Rocks'n'Diamonds page A complete overview

1995 video games
DOS games
Puzzle video games
Linux games
MacOS games
MorphOS games
Rocks-and-diamonds games
Windows games
AmigaOS 4 games
Multiplayer and single-player video games
Free software programmed in C
Software using the GPL license
Open-source video games
Video games developed in Germany
Unix games